Zalam (also known as Rūdbār Zalam and Z̧alam Rūdbār) is a village in Garmab Rural District, Chahardangeh District, Sari County, Mazandaran Province, Iran. At the 2006 census, its population was 180, in 49 families.

References 

Populated places in Sari County